A Landing Ship Medium (LSM) was an amphibious assault ship of the United States Navy in World War II.  Of a size between that of Landing Ships Tank  and Landing Craft Infantry, 558 LSMs were built for the USN between 1944 and 1945. Most of vessels built on this frame were regular transports, while several dozen were converted during construction to specialized roles. Most LSMs were scrapped during the Cold War, but several were sold by the United States Department of Defense to foreign nations or private shipping companies.

OPNAV N95 established a new LSM program in 2020. The new LSM will be 350 to 400 ft long, able to operate at 22 knots and have a range of 6500 miles. The cost will be much lower than traditional amphibious shipping, according to a story in the March 2023 Marine Corps Gazette.  The piece suggests that a MLR (Marine Littoral Regiment) would need 9 LSMs. As a comparison the Jason class of the Greek Navy is about 380 ft long, with a top speed of 18 knots

LSM-1-class Landing Ship Medium (Transport)

List of LSM-1-class ships
In total, 558 LSM ships were launched. Some notable examples include:

LSM(R)-188-class Landing Ship Medium (Rocket)

LSM(R)-401-class Landing Ship Medium (Rocket) 

  (LSM(R)-401), later reclassified (LFR-401)
  (LSM(R)-402)
  (LSM(R)-403)
  (LSM(R)-404), later reclassified (LFR-404)
  (LSM(R)-405), later reclassified (LFR-405)
  (LSM(R)-406)
 USS Chariton River (LSM(R)-407)
  (LSM(R)-408)
 USS Clarion River (LSM(R)-409), later reclassified (LFR-409)
  (LSM(R)-410)
  (LSM(R)-411)
  (LSM(R)-412), later reclassified (LFR-412)

LSM(R)-501-class Landing Ship Medium (Rocket)

  (LSM(R)-501), later reclassified (IX-501)
  (LSM(R)-502)
  (LSM(R)-503)
  (LSM(R)-504)
  (LSM(R)-505)
  (LSM(R)-506)
 USS Greenbrier River (LSM(R)-507)
 USS Gunnison River (LSM(R)-508), later reclassified and renamed USS Targeteer (YV-3)
  (LSM(R)-509)
  (LSM(R)-510)
  (LSM(R)-511)
  (LSM(R)-512), later reclassified (LFR-512)
  (LSM(R)-513), later reclassified (LFR-513)
  (LSM(R)-514)
  (LSM(R)-515), later reclassified (LFR-515)
  (LSM(R)-516)
 USS Pee Dee River (LSM(R)-517)
  (LSM(R)-518)
 USS Powder River (LSM(R)-519)
  (LSM(R)-520)
  (LSM(R)-521)
  (LSM(R)-522), later reclassified (LFR-522)
  (LSM(R)-523)
 USS Saint Croix River (LSM(R)-524)
 USS St. Francis River (LSM(R)-525), later reclassified (LFR-525)
  (LSM(R)-526)
 USS St. Joseph's River (LSM(R)-527)
 USS St. Mary's River (LSM(R)-528)
 USS St. Regis River (LSM(R)-529)
  (LSM(R)-530)
  (LSM(R)-531), later reclassified (LFR-531)
  (LSM(R)-532)
  (LSM(R)-533)
  (LSM(R)-534)
  (LSM(R)-535)
 USS White River (LSM(R)-536), later reclassified (LFR-536)

Gypsy-class Salvage Lifting Vessels

 , authorized as LSM-549
 USS Mender (ARS(D)-2), authorized as LSM-550
 USS Salvager (ARS(D)-3), authorized as LSM-551, later reclassified to YMLC-3
 USS Windlass (ARS(D)-4), authorized as LSM-552, later reclassified to YMLC-4

Production

Dates are launch dates.

 Brown Shipbuilding: Houston, TX: 254 (May 1944 - Apr 1946)
 purpose-built yard for the war effort
 Charleston Navy Yard, North Charleston, SC: 121 (May 1944 - Nov 1945)
 traditional military yard
 Dravo Corporation, Wilmington, DE: 65 (Apr 1944 - May 1945)
 purpose-built yard for the war effort
 Pullman Company, Chicago, IL: 44 (May 1944 - May 1945)
 traditional rail car manufacturer
 Federal Shipbuilding and Drydock Company, Newark, NJ: 42 (May 1944 - Feb 1945)
 traditional civil and military yard
 Western Pipe and Steel, San Pedro, CA: 32 (Aug 1944 - Mar 1945)
 traditional civil yard

Delivery:
 Q2 1944: 74
 Q3 1944: 129
 Q4 1944: 132
 Q1 1945: 111
 Q2 1945: 58
 Q3 1945: 30
 Q4 1945: 15
 1946: 9

Legacy
One LSM, survived in its original configuration until around 2010. It was in storage at Marine Station Camp Lejeune in Jacksonville, North Carolina. It was slated to become the centerpiece of the Museum of the Marine, but due to changed plans, was scrapped between 2010 and 2014.

Light Amphibious Warship (LAW)
As of February 2023 the US Marine Corps has proposed the purchase of 18 to 35 modern LSMs; this LSM concept was previously known as the Light Amphibious Warship (LAW).

See also
Landing Ship, Infantry
Mark 8 Landing Craft Tank
Landing Ship Medium#Light Amphibious Warship (LAW)

References 

 LSM-LSMR: WWII Amphibious Forces, Turner Publishing Co.; Paducah, Kentucky,  
 Jane's Fighting Ships, 1980–81
US Navy, ONI 226, Allied Landing Craft and Ships, April 1944

External links 
 USS LSM/LSMR Association
 NavSource Photo Archives
 Landing Ships ibiblio.org
My Life Aboard the LSM-319 by Eugene Carey
The Navy's Smallest Aircraft Carrier, July 1958, Popular Mechanics small article on conversion of LSM-445 to a target drone launching vessel

Landing Ship Medium (LSM)
Landing ships of the United States Navy
Ship classes of the French Navy